Helen Gee might refer to: 

 Helen Gee (curator)
 Helen Gee (environmentalist)